Pettigru Street Historic District is a historic tree-lined neighborhood east of Main Street in downtown Greenville, South Carolina. It is home to 88 structures built between 1890 and 1930 with the majority built between 1910 and 1930. It is known for its wide variety of architectural styles including Queen Anne, Colonial Revival, and Bungalow. The area is an example of evolution of architectural style from the Victorian era to the early 1930s similar to the growth in the city of Greenville as a whole during that time.

The land belonged to the James Boyce and Rowley families until the turn of the century.  At that time, the land was divided into multiple lots, development increased, and several new streets were added.  It was home to the prominent business people and mill owners in the area.

Nominated in 1981, the Pettigru Street Historic District was listed on the National Register of Historic Places in 1982 making it the largest district in the city.  It is one of several historic listings in the town of Greenville. The district is a mixture of both commercial and residential properties, but remains largely residential to this day.  Key properties include the Poinsett Club on East Washington Street, Hayne School on Toy Street, and Pettigru Place Bed and Breakfast on Pettigru Street.

References

External links 
 City of Greenville, SC
 Poinsett Club
 Pettigru Place Bed and Breakfast

Houses on the National Register of Historic Places in South Carolina
Queen Anne architecture in South Carolina
Colonial Revival architecture in South Carolina
Historic districts in Greenville County, South Carolina
National Register of Historic Places in Greenville, South Carolina
Houses in Greenville County, South Carolina
Historic districts on the National Register of Historic Places in South Carolina